The 1st constituency of the Creuse (French: Première circonscription de la Creuse) was a French legislative constituency in the Creuse département. It was abolished in the 2010 redistricting of French legislative constituencies, its last deputy was Michel Vergnier. From the 2012 election onwards, the entire department was one constituency.

Election Results

2007

References 

Defunct French legislative constituencies
French legislative constituencies of Creuse
1988 establishments in France
2010 disestablishments in France